Mucho Locos is a 1966 Warner Bros. Merrie Melodies cartoon directed by Robert McKimson. The short was released on February 5, 1966, and stars Daffy Duck and Speedy Gonzales.

In the short, Speedy highlights some of his and Daffy's previous exploits. It was the only cartoon in the series where Daffy gets the upper hand at the end. It was also the final appearance of Porky Pig in the Golden Age of Animation. Porky appears in the Robin Hood Daffy segment. It is the only cartoon to have Porky Pig and Speedy Gonzales in the same film, although the two never interact.

Plot
Sitting in front of a broken TV in a junkyard, Speedy Gonzales encourages a young mouse named Jose to watch "imagination TV." "The stupidest creature on Earth has always been the duck," Speedy claims, "and the smartest is the mouse." Speedy and Jose imagine the evidence, in the form of redrawn scenes from the following cartoons: Robin Hood Daffy, Tortilla Flaps, Deduce, You Say, Mexicali Shmoes, and China Jones.

Unfortunately for Speedy, Daffy has been watching the whole time, and emerges through the broken TV and hits Speedy with a mallet for the insults. Daffy calls Speedy a stupid mouse and he called himself a smart duck. Speedy decides to go home, stating that "this imagination TV gives me the terrible headaches!" This gives Jose something to ponder: "It looks so real. Could it be my imagination?"

Cast and crew
Voice cast
 Mel Blanc voices Daffy Duck, Speedy Gonzales, Crow, Cats, Mice

Crew
 New Footage Director: Robert McKimson
 "Mexicali Shmoes" sequence directed by Friz Freleng
 "Robin Hood Daffy" and "Deduce You Say" sequences directed by Chuck Jones
 Additional Story: David Detiege
 "Robin Hood Daffy" and "Deduce You Say" stories by Michael Maltese
 "Tortilla Flaps" and "China Jones" stories by Tedd Pierce (uncredited)
 Uncredited Animation: Arthur Davis, Ken Harris, Abe Levitow, Tom Ray and Ted Bonnicksen

See also
 List of Daffy Duck cartoons

References

External links
 
 

1966 films
1966 animated films
1966 short films
Merrie Melodies short films
Warner Bros. Cartoons animated short films
Films scored by Herman Stein
Daffy Duck films
Porky Pig films
Speedy Gonzales films
1960s Warner Bros. animated short films
1960s English-language films